Newark Academy may refer to:

Newark Academy, a private school in Livingston, New Jersey, United States
The Newark Academy, a secondary school in Balderton, Nottinghamshire, England
Newark Collegiate Academy, a high school located in Newark, New Jersey, United States

See also
Newark High School (disambiguation)
Newark (disambiguation)